Richard Hamilton (born 29 September 1973) is a British rower. He competed in the men's eight event at the 1996 Summer Olympics.

References

External links
 

1973 births
Living people
British male rowers
Olympic rowers of Great Britain
Rowers at the 1996 Summer Olympics
Sportspeople from Plymouth, Devon